The software industry in China is the business of developing and publishing software and related services in China. The size of the industry including software and information services in 2013 was worth 3060 billion RMB (about $493 billion) according to the Ministry of Industry and Information Technology.

Companies
Leaders in the enterprise software market are UFIDA Software, Kingdee, and SAP.

See also
Software companies of China
China Software Industry Association
Institute of Software, Chinese Academy of Sciences
Dalian Software Park
Business process outsourcing in China

References 

Industry in China
China